Port Nicholson is an earlier name for Wellington Harbour, New Zealand

Port Nicholson may also refer to:
, a cargo ship of Commonwealth and Dominion Line, launched in 1918 and torpedoed and sunk in 1942